Rapperswil-Jona is a municipality in the Wahlkreis (constituency) of See-Gaster in the canton of St. Gallen in Switzerland.
Besides Rapperswil and Jona, which were separate municipalities until 2006, Rapperswil-Jona also includes Bollingen, Busskirch, Curtiberg, Kempraten-Lenggis, Wagen, and Wurmsbach.

The official language of Rapperswil is (the Swiss variety of Standard) German, but the main spoken language is the local variant of the Alemannic Swiss German dialect.

Today

On January 1, 2007, the municipalities of Rapperswil and Jona merged to form a new political entity. After the merger Rapperswil-Jona had a population of 25,777 (17,799 from Jona and 7,601 from Rapperswil). This makes it the second largest town in the canton of St. Gallen after the capital St. Gallen itself.

Rapperswil-Jona is one of the most significant traffic junctions in the region, and Rapperswil railway station is a nodal point for the Swiss Federal Railways, Südostbahn and S-Bahn Zürich lines. Zürichsee-Schifffahrtsgesellschaft (commonly abbreviated to ZSG) operates passenger vessels on the Lake Zürich, connecting surrounding towns between Zürich-Bürkliplatz and Rapperswil. This connection has been part of old pilgrimage routes. From early centuries, a wooden footbridge led across Lake Zürich. At a later stage, the bridge was replaced by a stone dam. In 2001, a new wooden footbridge was opened alongside the dam for the first 840 meters of the crossing. It was built in the same place as the original bridge and links Rapperswil with the nearby bridge chapel (Heilig Hüsli) built in 1551.

The main sights are concentrated in the centre of Rapperswil and can be seen while strolling through the medieval alleys. The main sights of Rapperswil are its roses, the castle, the reconstructed wooden bridge to Hurden with its bridge chapel, and a Capuchin monastery. There are also a number of churches, chapels, and the nearby Wurmsbach Abbey. In the surroundings of the town there are a number of churches. St. John's Church in Rapperswil was built around 1220 and became Rapperswil's parish church in 1253, the Chapel St. Ursula in the village of Kempraten was built around 885. The St. Dionysius Chapel, dedicated to Denis, the first bishop of Paris, was reconstructed in 1493 and attracts pilgrims. The nunnery at Wurmsbach (Wurmsbach Abbey) was established in 1259 and today houses an institute for girls, and St. Martin Busskirch is the former parish church of Rapperswil.

Bollingen is known for the "Tower" built there by Carl Jung. Kempraten is one of the most important archeological sites in the canton of St. Gallen and is located at the norther shore of Obersee, the eastern part of Lake Zürich.

History

Settlements in the area of Rapperswil-Jona date back at least 5000 years. Evidence includes archaeological relicts collected from the Neolithic Seegubel site or the body burials of the La Tène culture. Centum Prata, after which Kempraten is named, is an important archeological site of the Gallo-Roman era.

Atop the Lindenhof hill overlooking a former small village (Endingen), Rapperswil Castle was built around 1220 by the Counts of Rapperswil and is first mentioned in 1229. The town was founded when the nobility of Rapperswil moved from Altendorf across the lake to Rapperswil. The town was soon acquired by the Habsburg family who, in 1358/60, built the wooden bridge across the upper Lake Zürich. Later, the town bought itself free, and ending Old Zürich War made an alliance with the Swiss Confederation.

Because of its strategic location along important infrastructure the town grew rich because of flourishing trade. This allowed a certain degree of freedom which was ended with the formation of Swiss cantons by Napoleon. Rapperswil was at first part of the Helvetic canton of Linth. After 1803's Act of Mediation, it joined the canton of St. Gallen. The locational advantage of the place attracted the national Circus Knie who built its headquarters in Rapperswil in 1919. The circus is now also responsible for the Knie's Kinderzoo and the Circus Museum.

Cultural heritage 
After the Seedamm causeway and bridge were built in 1878, the Heilig Hüsli chapel was the only remaining structure of the medieval wooden bridge. It stood isolated in the lake and was not accessible to visitors until the reconstruction of the former wooden bridge was erected in 2001. The reconstructed wooden bridge is listed as Swiss heritage sites of national significance as part of the Seedamm area including Heilig Hüsli and the remains of the prehistoric wooden bridges respectively stilt house settlements.

Located on Obersee lakeshore at the Seedamm isthmus, an ice age moraine (Linth Glacier) between the Obersee and the main body of the Zürichsee, the area was in close vicinity to the prehistoric lake crossings, neighbored by four Prehistoric pile dwelling settlements: Freienbach–Hurden Rosshorn, Freienbach–Hurden Seefeld, Seegubel and Rapperswil-Jona–Technikum.

As well as being part of the 56 Swiss sites of the UNESCO World Heritage Site Prehistoric pile dwellings around the Alps, the settlements are also listed in the Swiss inventory of cultural property of national and regional significance as a Class object.

There are further sites that are listed as in the Swiss inventory of cultural property of national and regional significance as Class A object: The chapel of St. Dionys, Schloss Rapperswil with the Polish Museum and its archive and the Rathaus (Town Council house) of Rapperswil are the more recent structures. The Roman Vicus Centum Prata at Kempraten and the Seedamm region and historical bridge (which had existed in some form since the prehistoric era through the Middle Ages with the most recent bridge in 2001 and Heilig Hüsli) round out the five.

Geography
Of this area, 37.4% is used for agricultural purposes, while 30.6% is forested. Of the rest of the land, 28.6% is settled (buildings or roads) and the remainder (3.4%) is non-productive (rivers or lakes).

Rapperswil-Jona is situated across the Seedamm, an ice age moraine built by the Linth Glacier, which separates Lake Zurich into an upper and lower part. The Linth Glacier, named after the River Linth, also formed Lake Zurich itself (glacial lake) and shaped the surrounding land. It was connected to the Rhine Glacier. The River Jona, which originates near Gibswil in the canton of Zürich, runs through Rapperswil-Jona and flows into Obersee.

Demographics
Most of the population speaks German (86.9%), with Italian being second most common ( 3.1%) and Serbo-Croatian being third (2.1%).

In the 2007 federal election the most popular party was the SVP which received 30.3% of the vote.  The next three most popular parties were the CVP (19.3%), the SP (17%) and the FDP (13.1%).

In Rapperswil-Jona about 74.6% of the population (between age 25-64) have completed either non-mandatory upper secondary education or additional higher education (either university or a Fachhochschule).

Economy
, Rapperswil-Jona had an unemployment rate of 1.84%.  , there were 183 people employed in the primary economic sector and about 56 businesses involved in this sector.  3,898 people are employed in the secondary sector and there are 231 businesses in this sector.  8,340 people are employed in the tertiary sector, with 1,077 businesses in this sector.

Among other companies, Geberit, LafargeHolcim, Obersee Nachrichten and Radio Zürisee are situated in Rapperswil-Jona.

Transportation

Train

This railway station is served by S-Bahn lines S5, S7, S15 and S40 of the Zürich S-Bahn, the first three of which provide frequent (6 trains per hour) and fast (36 minute journey time) links to the city of Zürich. It is also a calling point of the Voralpen-Express, an InterRegio running hourly between Lucerne and St. Gallen. The S5, S40 and the Voralpen-Express use the Seedamm causeway (Rapperswil-Pfäffikon railway). Rapperswil railway station is also the terminus of an hourly regional train, S6 of St. Gallen S-Bahn, that operates south-east to Schwanden/Linthal via Ziegelbrücke. The S5 and S15 of ZVV are operated by Swiss Federal Railways, whereas the S6, S40 and the Voralpen-Express are operated by Südostbahn (SOB).

A fifth station, in Bollingen, is now disfunct.

Bus
The municipality is served by a local bus service, Stadtbus Rapperswil-Jona, provided since 2008 by the Verkehrsbetriebe Zürichsee und Oberland (VZO). In addition,  operates line 622 to Wagen (continues to St. Gallenkappel/Wattwil) and line 621 to Buech/St. Dyonis. Bus services are as follows:

Boat
Rapperswil harbour is adjacent to the old town of Rapperswil and Rapperswil railway station. Lake shipping services of the Zürichsee-Schifffahrtsgesellschaft (ZSG) provide routes to Zürich and other lakeside towns on Lake Zürich. Most boats of ZSG dock Ufenau island near Rapperswil harbour. 

During summer, there is a ferry across Obersee. The ferry connects a pier near the University of Applied Sciences Rapperswil (now part of OST), just south of Rapperswil railway station, with Lachen and Altendorf in the canton of Schwyz.

Private transport
As of 2016, an average of 26,000 road vehicles cross the Seedamm causeway and the Bahnhofstrasse in Rapperswil every day. Rapperswil-Jona is expected to participate as the first Swiss city in a pilot project for so-called Mobility pricing in order to relieve the traffic on road and rail during rush hours.

Sport

The National League ice hockey team Rapperswil-Jona Lakers plays in the 6,200-seat St. Galler Kantonalbank Arena.

The FC Rapperswil-Jona is a football team. It was founded in 1928 and is now playing in the Swiss Promotion League.

In 2006, Rapperswill-Jona hosted the World Orienteering Championships.

International relations

Rapperswil-Jona is twinned with:

Notable people 
 and

Gallery and map
{ "type": "FeatureCollection", "features":  [
    { "type": "Feature",
      "properties": {
        "title": "Wurmsbach Abbey",
        "marker-symbol": "-number",
        "marker-color": "302060"
      },
      "geometry": {
        "type": "Point",
        "coordinates": [ 8.8646, 47.2195 ] }},
    { "type": "Feature",
      "properties": {
        "title": "Chapel of St. Dionys",
        "marker-symbol": "-number",
        "marker-color": "302060" },
      "geometry": {
        "type": "Point",
        "coordinates": [ 8.86141, 47.22737 ] }},
    { "type": "Feature",
      "properties": {
        "title": "St. Martin Busskirch",
        "marker-symbol": "-number",
        "marker-color": "302060"
      },
      "geometry": {
        "type": "Point",
        "coordinates": [ 8.83344, 47.21703 ] }},
    { "type": "Feature",
      "properties": {
        "title": "Rathaus Rapperswil",
        "marker-symbol": "-number",
        "marker-color": "302060"
      },
      "geometry": {
        "type": "Point",
        "coordinates": [ 8.81641, 47.22636 ] }},
    { "type": "Feature",
      "properties": {
        "title": "Schloss Rapperswil, Polish Museum",
        "marker-symbol": "-number",
        "marker-color": "302060"
      },
      "geometry": {
        "type": "Point",
        "coordinates": [ 8.81553, 47.22736 ] }},
    { "type": "Feature",
      "properties": {
        "title": "Seedamm",
        "marker-symbol": "-number",
        "marker-color": "302060"
      },
      "geometry": {
        "type": "Point",
        "coordinates": [ 8.81032, 47.22116 ] }},
    {
      "type": "Feature",
      "properties": {
        "title": "Holzbrücke Rapperswil-Hurden",
        "marker-symbol": "-number",
        "marker-color": "302060"
      },
      "geometry": {
        "type": "Point",
        "coordinates": [ 8.81433, 47.22163 ] }}
  ] }

See also 
 Settlements comprised by the municipality of Rapperswil-Jona

 Points of interest

References

External links

Rapperswil-Jona (official site) 
Capuchin monastery 
University of Applied Sciences Rapperswil, HSR (university)
A brief history of Rapperswil

 
Municipalities of the canton of St. Gallen
Cities in Switzerland
Cultural property of national significance in the canton of St. Gallen
Populated places on Lake Zurich
States and territories established in 2007
2007 establishments in Switzerland